Spui is a village in the Dutch province of Zeeland. It is a part of the municipality of Terneuzen, and lies about 27 km southeast of Vlissingen.

The village was first mentioned in 1549 as "ter Zouter Speye", and refers to a type of discharge lock.

In 1941, the association building was converted into a Reformed Church. In 1974, it was no longer used, and has been converted in a Masonic lodge.

Gallery

References

Populated places in Zeeland
Terneuzen